Perumanallur is a textile Industrial city situated near Tirupur, Tamil Nadu, India. Coimbatore city on the National Highway (NH 47) which now bypasses outside the town. It is a cross junction in NH-47 connecting Cochin/Coimbatore with Erode/Salem and Tirupur with Gobichettipalayam. 

Perumanallur has around 18,000 peoples.

Economy
Permanallur has grown into an epicenter for textile industry. New Tirupur Industrial Park (Nethaji Apparel Park), which is an integrated industrial park, is 4 km away from Perumanallur. Saturday market at Perumanallur attracts people from neighbouring villages that buy and sell agricultural and other household products.

Transport
All buses from Tirupur to Kunnathur, Nambiyur, Kanakkampalayam (Bus Nos. 10, 26A, 54, 26 and 43) pass through Perumanallur. The place is 11 km from Tirupur and 10 km from Avinashi.

Adjacent communities 

 Coimbatore
 Avinashi
 Tiruppur
 Chengapalli
 Nambiyur
 Kunnathur
 Vijayamangalam
 Gobichettipalayam
 Perundurai
 Mangalam
 Palladam
 Sevur
 Veerapandi
 Thirumuruganpoondi
 Tiruppur New Bus stand
 Boyampalayam

Tamil Nadu
Tiruppur